Governor Washington, Jr., known by his stage name Gio Washington (formerly Governor), is an American R&B and soul recording artist from Charles City, Virginia. He is perhaps best known as a singer-songwriter, who was once signed to T.I.'s Grand Hustle imprint, under the aegis of Atlantic Records. In 2010, he signed to the newly formed G-Note Records, a subsidiary label of 50 Cent's G-Unit Records.

Life and career

1983–2004: Early life and career beginnings 
Governor Washington Jr. was born in Charles City, Virginia. His father was a preacher. After declining an offer to attend the Berklee College of Music, he formed the Jodeci-style R&B group, Case Closed, where he performed under the moniker, Country Boy. After moving to New York City, then back to Virginia, Washington left the group and returned to New York. When the group disbanded, he tried to make it on its own. Warlock Records eventually signed Washington and released his debut album Another State Of Mind, in 2000.

At that time he met the influential music executives and production team, Trackmasters, while he changed his style from R&B to hip-hop. 50 Cent was signed to the Trackmasters at that time as well, and Washington and 50 Cent recorded about six songs for a prospective album called Best of Both Worlds, which was never released. After the split-up with Trackmasters in 2002, Washington met Wyclef Jean, who helped him sign a deal with Atlantic Records. He even made a dozen songs with Dr. Dre, for his debut album on Atlantic, but frictions between Dre's Aftermath and Atlantic, made those songs never see the light of the day.

2005–2006: Grand Hustle signing and Son of Pain
In 2005, American rapper T.I. added Washington, to his Grand Hustle Records imprint, after Atlantic Records chose T.I. to act as his mentor. Atlantic Records' plan for Washington, who joined Atlantic's roster almost four years prior, was to market him a devotee, or a card-carrying member of T.I.'s "camp.". Atlantic first tried to pair him with renowned record producer Dr. Dre, and then with gangsta rapper 50 Cent; however both plans fell through. In search of quick jolt of street credibility, the label brokered a deal for the singer to join T.I.'s imprint. In 2006, Washington appeared alongside T.I., performing the song "Hello", from T.I.'s album King, for the Atlanta-based rapper's AOL Sessions. After appearing on several of Grand Hustle'resident disc jockey, DJ Drama's Gangsta Grillz mixtapes, Washington later released his Grand Hustle/Atlantic debut, titled Son of Pain, in September 2006. The album's production was handled by Just Blaze, Scott Storch, Wyclef Jean and Raphael Saadiq, among others. The album debuted at number 50 on the US Billboard Top R&B/Hip-Hop Albums.

2009–present: G-Unit signing
After signing to G-Unit Records in 2009, Washington was signed to the newly formed subsidiary G-Note Records, where he released the first single off his upcoming album. He had this to say about signing with the label,  The song is called "Here We Go Again" and features 50 Cent. The song will be released for digital download on December 27, 2010. In an interview with G-Unit Radio, 50 Cent said that Washington was "extremely talented" and that "he is about to blow". Along with releasing his first single, "Here We Go Again" off his upcoming album, Washington reported that he was working on mixtapes as well as putting out new music on thisis50.com regularly to promote his album.

In an interview with HipHopNMore, Washington revealed the title for his upcoming album which is called, A Touch of Magic. The album will be released under G-Note Records and was initially scheduled for a summer 2011 release date. Washington also spoke about upcoming music with 50 Cent on the album and had this to say, "The first two or three collaborations was to allow people to get used to a particular feel and sound, while being connected to one of the most successful rappers on earth. Now, we are focusing on releasing songs that showcase that sound, speaking of myself as a solo artist".

In 2013, Washington began performing under the pseudonym, Gio Washington. In March 2015, Washington and 50 Cent reunited on a song titled "Annie", recorded for the 50 Cent executive produced Starz series, Power.

Personal life

Car accident
Gio Washington was seriously injured in a vehicle accident on the night of August 8, 2015. The accident catapulted Washington from his vehicle, leaving him with a collapsed lung, broken ribs and internal injuries.

Discography

Studio albums

Singles

Guest appearances

References

External links
 
 
 
 

African-American male singer-songwriters
Living people
People from Charles City, Virginia
Singer-songwriters from Virginia
American hip hop singers
1983 births
Berklee College of Music alumni
American rhythm and blues singer-songwriters
American soul singers
21st-century African-American male singers